The 2nd constituency of Aube is a French legislative constituency in the Aube département.  It is currently represented by Valérie Bazin-Malgras of the LR.

Description

It is located in the south of the department, and takes in part of the town of Troyes.

Historic Representation

Election results

2022

 
 
|-
| colspan="8" bgcolor="#E9E9E9"|
|-

2017

2012

|- style="background-color:#E9E9E9;text-align:center;"
! colspan="2" rowspan="2" style="text-align:left;" | Candidate
! rowspan="2" colspan="2" style="text-align:left;" | Party
! colspan="2" | 1st round
! colspan="2" | 2nd round
|- style="background-color:#E9E9E9;text-align:center;"
! width="75" | Votes
! width="30" | %
! width="75" | Votes
! width="30" | %
|-
| style="background-color:" |
| style="text-align:left;" | Jean-Claude Mathis
| style="text-align:left;" | Union for a Popular Movement
| UMP
| 
| 38.55%
| 
| 57.24%
|-
| style="background-color:" |
| style="text-align:left;" | Yves Fournier
| style="text-align:left;" | Socialist Party
| PS
| 
| 30.15%
| 
| 42.76%
|-
| style="background-color:" |
| style="text-align:left;" | Gérard Cianni
| style="text-align:left;" | National Front
| FN
| 
| 20.20%
| colspan="2" style="text-align:left;" |
|-
| style="background-color:" |
| style="text-align:left;" | Jean-Pierre Cornevin
| style="text-align:left;" | Left Front
| FG
| 
| 4.84%
| colspan="2" style="text-align:left;" |
|-
| style="background-color:" |
| style="text-align:left;" | Karima Ouadah
| style="text-align:left;" | 
| CEN
| 
| 1.44%
| colspan="2" style="text-align:left;" |
|-
| style="background-color:" |
| style="text-align:left;" | Claudine François-Wilser
| style="text-align:left;" | Ecologist
| ECO
| 
| 1.12%
| colspan="2" style="text-align:left;" |
|-
| style="background-color:" |
| style="text-align:left;" | Sébastien Fournillon
| style="text-align:left;" | Miscellaneous Right
| DVD
| 
| 1.03%
| colspan="2" style="text-align:left;" |
|-
| style="background-color:" |
| style="text-align:left;" | Michèle Roux
| style="text-align:left;" | Ecologist
| ECO
| 
| 0.85%
| colspan="2" style="text-align:left;" |
|-
| style="background-color:" |
| style="text-align:left;" | Claudia Martins Amado
| style="text-align:left;" | Miscellaneous Right
| DVD
| 
| 0.84%
| colspan="2" style="text-align:left;" |
|-
| style="background-color:" |
| style="text-align:left;" | Marie-Pierre Marc
| style="text-align:left;" | Far Left
| EXG
| 
| 0.68%
| colspan="2" style="text-align:left;" |
|-
| style="background-color:" |
| style="text-align:left;" | Bernard Waymel
| style="text-align:left;" | Miscellaneous Right
| DVD
| 
| 0.31%
| colspan="2" style="text-align:left;" |
|-
| colspan="8" style="background-color:#E9E9E9;"|
|- style="font-weight:bold"
| colspan="4" style="text-align:left;" | Total
| 
| 100%
| 
| 100%
|-
| colspan="8" style="background-color:#E9E9E9;"|
|-
| colspan="4" style="text-align:left;" | Registered voters
| 
| style="background-color:#E9E9E9;"|
| 
| style="background-color:#E9E9E9;"|
|-
| colspan="4" style="text-align:left;" | Blank/Void ballots
| 
| 1.67%
| 
| 4.36%
|-
| colspan="4" style="text-align:left;" | Turnout
| 
| 60.08%
| 
| 58.53%
|-
| colspan="4" style="text-align:left;" | Abstentions
| 
| 39.92%
| 
| 41.47%
|-
| colspan="8" style="background-color:#E9E9E9;"|
|- style="font-weight:bold"
| colspan="6" style="text-align:left;" | Result
| colspan="2" style="background-color:" | UMP HOLD
|}

2007

|- style="background-color:#E9E9E9;text-align:center;"
! colspan="2" rowspan="2" style="text-align:left;" | Candidate
! rowspan="2" colspan="2" style="text-align:left;" | Party
! colspan="2" | 1st round
! colspan="2" | 2nd round
|- style="background-color:#E9E9E9;text-align:center;"
! width="75" | Votes
! width="30" | %
! width="75" | Votes
! width="30" | %
|-
| style="background-color:" |
| style="text-align:left;" | Jean-Claude Mathis
| style="text-align:left;" | Union for a Popular Movement
| UMP
| 
| 47.59%
| 
| 65.26%
|-
| style="background-color:" |
| style="text-align:left;" | Saliha Ayadi
| style="text-align:left;" | Radical Party of the Left
| PRG
| 
| 15.81%
| 
| 34.74%
|-
| style="background-color:" |
| style="text-align:left;" | Didier Leprince
| style="text-align:left;" | Miscellaneous Right
| DVD
| 
| 8.25%
| colspan="2" style="text-align:left;" |
|-
| style="background-color:" |
| style="text-align:left;" | Marc Malarmey
| style="text-align:left;" | National Front
| FN
| 
| 7.93%
| colspan="2" style="text-align:left;" |
|-
| style="background-color:" |
| style="text-align:left;" | Elisabeth Gariglio
| style="text-align:left;" | Democratic Movement
| MoDem
| 
| 5.95%
| colspan="2" style="text-align:left;" |
|-
| style="background-color:" |
| style="text-align:left;" | Jean-Pierre Cornevin
| style="text-align:left;" | Communist
| COM
| 
| 4.65%
| colspan="2" style="text-align:left;" |
|-
| style="background-color:" |
| style="text-align:left;" | Hervé Murgier
| style="text-align:left;" | The Greens
| VEC
| 
| 3.33%
| colspan="2" style="text-align:left;" |
|-
| style="background-color:" |
| style="text-align:left;" | Jean Vivet
| style="text-align:left;" | Movement for France
| MPF
| 
| 2.09%
| colspan="2" style="text-align:left;" |
|-
| style="background-color:" |
| style="text-align:left;" | Déolinda Cardoso
| style="text-align:left;" | Far Left
| EXG
| 
| 1.42%
| colspan="2" style="text-align:left;" |
|-
| style="background-color:" |
| style="text-align:left;" | Anne Baicry
| style="text-align:left;" | Ecologist
| ECO
| 
| 1.34%
| colspan="2" style="text-align:left;" |
|-
| style="background-color:" |
| style="text-align:left;" | Denise Normant
| style="text-align:left;" | Divers
| DIV
| 
| 0.85%
| colspan="2" style="text-align:left;" |
|-
| style="background-color:" |
| style="text-align:left;" | Anne-Marie le Cadre
| style="text-align:left;" | Far Left
| EXG
| 
| 0.75%
| colspan="2" style="text-align:left;" |
|-
| colspan="8" style="background-color:#E9E9E9;"|
|- style="font-weight:bold"
| colspan="4" style="text-align:left;" | Total
| 
| 100%
| 
| 100%
|-
| colspan="8" style="background-color:#E9E9E9;"|
|-
| colspan="4" style="text-align:left;" | Registered voters
| 
| style="background-color:#E9E9E9;"|
| 
| style="background-color:#E9E9E9;"|
|-
| colspan="4" style="text-align:left;" | Blank/Void ballots
| 
| 1.89%
| 
| 4.74%
|-
| colspan="4" style="text-align:left;" | Turnout
| 
| 58.70%
| 
| 54.88%
|-
| colspan="4" style="text-align:left;" | Abstentions
| 
| 41.30%
| 
| 45.12%
|-
| colspan="8" style="background-color:#E9E9E9;"|
|- style="font-weight:bold"
| colspan="6" style="text-align:left;" | Result
| colspan="2" style="background-color:" | UMP HOLD
|}

2002

 
 
 
 
 
 
 
|-
| colspan="8" bgcolor="#E9E9E9"|
|-

1997

References

Sources
 French Interior Ministry results website: 

2